Ingeborg of Denmark may refer to:

 Ingeborg of Denmark, Queen of France (1174–1237), wife of Philip II of France and daughter of Valdemar I of Denmark
 Ingeborg of Denmark, Queen of Norway (ca. 1244–1287), wife of Magnus VI of Norway and daughter of Eric IV of Denmark
 Ingeborg of Denmark, Duchess of Mecklenburg (1347–1370), wife of Henry III, Duke of Mecklenburg, daughter of Valdemar IV of Denmark
 Ingeborg of Denmark, Duchess of Västergötland (1878–1958), wife of Prince Carl of Sweden, Duke of Västergötland, daughter Frederick VIII of Denmark